John Lesinski may refer to:

 John Lesinski Sr. (1885-1950), U.S. Representative from Michigan
 John Lesinski Jr. (1914-2005), U.S. Representative from Michigan

See also
 T. John Lesinski, politician and jurist from Wayne County, Michigan